is a district located in Ehime Prefecture, Japan. As of 2004, the district has an estimated population of 17,299. The total area is 340.37 km2.

The district has two towns:
Kihoku
Matsuno

History
 Due to 1878 land reforms, the district was founded when it broke off from the Uwa District.  (2 towns, 31 villages)
 July 1, 1895 — The village of Tsushima broke up into the villages of Takachika and Iwamatsu.  (2 towns, 32 villages)
 July 1, 1899 — The village of Kiyomitsu broke up into the villages of Mimaki and Kiyomitsu.  (2 towns, 33 villages)
 May 1, 1917 — The village of Maruho merged into the town of Uwajima.  (2 towns, 32 villages)
 October 3, 1919 — The village of Iwamatsu gained town status.  (3 towns, 31 villages)
 August 1, 1921 — The town of Uwajima and the village of Yawata merged to form the city of Uwajima.  (2 towns, 30 villages)
 September 1, 1934 — The village of Kushima merged into the city of Uwajima.  (2 towns, 29 villages)
 February 11, 1938 — The village of Tamajiri merged into the town of Yoshida.  (2 towns, 28 villages)
 September 10, 1938 — The village of Takachika merged into the town of Iwamatsu.  (2 towns, 27 villages)
 November 10, 1940 — The village of Akeharu was renamed and gained town status to become the town of Matsumaru.  (3 towns, 26 villages)
 November 10, 1941 — The village of Asahi was renamed and gained town status to become the town of Chikanaga.  (4 towns, 25 villages)
 April 1, 1951 — Parts of the village of Kitanada merged into the town of Iwamatsu.
 October 10, 1954 — The villages of Mima, Narutae, and Futana merged to become the town of Mima.  (5 towns, 22 villages)
 February 11, 1955 — The villages of Kiyomitsu, Mimami, Kitanada, Hataji, Shimonada the town of Iwamatsu merged to form the town of Tsushima.  (5 towns, 17 villages)
 March 1, 1955 — The villages of Tachima, Kisakata, and Okuna merged into the town of Yoshida.  (5 towns, 14 villages)
 March 31, 1955
Parts of the village of Takamitsu and the village of Tamatsu from Higashiuwa District merged into the town of Yoshida.
The villages of Takamitsu (excluding parts) and Miura merged into the city of Uwajima.  (5 towns, 12 villages)
The villages of Yoshifuji, Aiji, Izumi, Mishima, and the town of Chikanaga merged to become the town of Hiromi.  (5 towns, 8 villages)
The village of Yoshinobu and the town of Matsumaru merged to become the town of Matsuno.  (5 towns, 7 villages)
 January 1, 1957 — The village of Kuno merged into the city of Uwajima.  (5 towns, 6 villages)
 April 1, 1958 — The villages of Shitaba, Komobuchi, Yusu, Tojima and Hiburijima merged to become the village of Uwaumi.  (5 towns, 2 villages)
 August 1, 1958 — Parts of the town of Hiromi merged into the town of Mima.
 April 1, 1974 — The village of Uwaumi merged into the city of Uwajima.  (5 towns, 1 village)
 January 1, 2005 — The town of Hiromi and the village of Hiyoshi merged to become the town of Kihoku.  (5 towns)
 August 1, 2005 — The towns of Mima, Tsushima and Yoshida merged into the expanded city of Uwajima.  (2 towns)

Kitauwa District